This is a list of films by the French director Éric Rohmer.

Filmography

Contes moraux (Six Moral Tales)
 1963 #1 La Boulangère de Monceau (The Bakery Girl of Monceau) — short, not released theatrically
 1963 #2 La Carrière de Suzanne (Suzanne's Career) — short, not released theatrically
 1967 #4 La Collectionneuse (The Collector)
 1969 #3 Ma nuit chez Maud (My Night at Maud's/My Night with  Maud) — although planned as the third moral tale, its production was delayed due to the unavailability of actor Jean-Louis Trintignant. It was released after the fourth tale.
 1970 #5 Le Genou de Claire (Claire's Knee)
 1972 #6 L'Amour l'après-midi (Love in the Afternoon/Chloe in the Afternoon)

Comédies et Proverbes (Comedies and Proverbs)
 1981 La Femme de l'aviateur (The Aviator's Wife) — "It is impossible to think about nothing."
 1982 Le Beau mariage (A Good Marriage) — "Can anyone refrain from building castles in Spain?"
 1983 Pauline à la plage (Pauline at the Beach) — "He who talks too much will hurt himself."
 1984 Les nuits de la pleine lune (Full Moon in Paris) — "He who has two women loses his soul, he who has two houses loses his mind."
 1986 Le Rayon vert (The Green Ray [UK] / Summer [North America]) — "Ah, for the days/that set our hearts ablaze,"
 1987 L'Ami de mon amie (My Girlfriend's Boyfriend/Boyfriends and Girlfriends) — "My friends' friends are my friends."

Contes des quatre saisons (Tales of the Four Seasons)
 1990 Conte de printemps (A Tale of Springtime)
 1992 Conte d'hiver (A Winter's Tale/A Tale of Winter)
 1996 Conte d'été (A Tale of Summer)
 1998 Conte d'automne (A Tale of Autumn)

Other feature films
 1962 Le Signe du lion
 1976 La Marquise d'O... (The Marquise of O...)
 1978 Perceval le Gallois
 1980 Catherine de Heilbronn (TV film)
 1987 Le trio en si bémol
 1987 Quatre Aventures de Reinette et Mirabelle (Four Adventures of Reinette and Mirabelle)
 1993 L'Arbre, le maire et la médiathèque (The Tree, The Mayor, and the Mediatheque)
 1995 Les Rendez-vous de Paris (Rendezvous in Paris)
 2000 L'Anglaise et le duc (The Lady and the Duke)
 2004 Triple Agent
 2007 Les Amours d'Astrée et de Céladon

Workshop Collection: Anniversaries
 1993 L'Anniversaire de Paula directed by Haydée Caillot with Eric Rohmer's help
 1996 France directed by Diane Baratier with Eric Rohmer's help
 1997 Des Goûts et des couleurs directed by Anne-Sophie Rouvillois with Eric Rohmer's help
 1997 Les Amis de Ninon directed by Françoise Quéré with Eric Rohmer's help
 1998 Heurts divers directed by Florence Rauscher and François Rauscher with Eric Rohmer's help

Workshop Collection: Le Modèle
 1998 Un dentiste exemplaire directed by Aurélia Alcais and Haydée Caillot with Eric Rohmer's help
 1999 Une histoire qui se dessine directed by Françoise Quéré with Eric Rohmer's help
 1999 La Cambrure directed by Edwige Shaki with Eric Rohmer's help
 2005 Le Canapé rouge directed by Marie Rivière with Eric Rohmer's help
 2008 Le Nu à la terrasse directed by Annie Balkarash with Eric Rohmer's help
 2009 La Proposition directed by Anne-Sophie Rouvillois with Eric Rohmer's help

Other short films
 1950 Journal d'un scélérat
 1951 Présentation ou Charlotte et son steak
 1952 Les Petites filles modèles (unfinished)
 1954 Bérénice
 1956 La Sonate à Kreutzer
 1958 Véronique et son cancre
 1963 La Boulangère de Monceau (The Bakery Girl of Monceau), from Contes moraux (Six Moral Tales)
 1964 Nadja à Paris
 1965 "Place de l'Étoile" from Paris vu par... (Six in Paris)
 1966 Une Étudiante d'aujourd'hui
 1967 Fermière à Montfaucon
 1983 Loup y es-tu? (Wolf, Are You There?)
 1986 Bois ton café (Drink your coffee it's getting cold!) (music video)

Works for television
Episodes for En profil dans le texte
 1963 Paysages urbains
 1964 Les cabinets de physique : la vie de société au 18e siècle|Les cabinets de physique, la vie de société au XVIIIe siècle
 1964 Les métamorphoses du paysage : l'ère industrielle|Les métamorphoses du paysage, l'ère industrielle
 1964 Les salons de Diderot
 1964 Perceval ou le conte du Graal
 1965 Don Quichotte de Cervantes
 1965 Les histoires extraordinaires d'Edgar Poe
 1965 Les caractères de La Bruyère
 1965 Entretien sur Pascal, a debate between Dominique Dubarle and Brice Parain
 1966 Victor Hugo, les contemplations
 1968 Entretien avec Mallarmé
 1968 Nancy au XVIIIe siècle
 1969 Victor Hugo architecte
 1969 La sorcière de Michelet
 1969 Le béton dans la ville
 1970 Le français langue vivante?

Episodes for Cinéastes de notre temps
 1965 Carl Th. Dreyer
 1966 Le celluloïd et le marbre

Episodes for Aller au cinéma
 1968 Post-face à l'Atalante
 1968 Louis Lumière
 1968 Post-face à Boudu sauvé des eaux

Ville nouvelle (1975, four-part miniseries)
 Épisode 1: L'enfance d'une ville
 Épisode 2: La diversité du paysage urbain
 Épisode 3: La forme de la ville
 Épisode 4: Le logement à la demande

Episode for Histoire de la vie privée
 1989 Les Jeux de société

non-series
 1967 L'homme et la machine
 1967 L'homme et les images
 1967 L'Homme et son journal
 1968 L'homme et les frontières
 1968 L'homme et les gouvernements

Rohmer, Eric
Rohmer, Eric
Éric Rohmer